Mayra Carolina Herrera Pérez (born 20 December 1988 in Guatemala City) is a Guatemalan race walker. She competed in the 20 km kilometres event at the 2012 Summer Olympics and 2016 Olympics.

She has qualified to represent Guatemala at the 2020 Summer Olympics.

Personal bests

Road walk
10 km: 45:47 min –  London, 11 Aug 2012
20 km: 1:30:41 hrs –  Taicang, 3 May 2014

Achievements

References

External links
 
 

1988 births
Living people
Sportspeople from Guatemala City
Guatemalan female racewalkers
Olympic athletes of Guatemala
Athletes (track and field) at the 2012 Summer Olympics
Athletes (track and field) at the 2016 Summer Olympics
Athletes (track and field) at the 2020 Summer Olympics
World Athletics Championships athletes for Guatemala
Central American Games silver medalists for Guatemala
Central American Games medalists in athletics
Athletes (track and field) at the 2019 Pan American Games
Pan American Games competitors for Guatemala